Ramon Torres Mendez (July 2, 1969 - September 1993) was a Mexican American who was a high-ranking member of the Logan Heights Gang, recruited by David "D" Barron in 1993. He reportedly served as a hitman to its leaders who trained him to carry out an assassination attempted against the Tijuana Cartel major rival Joaquín Guzmán Loera.

On May 24, 1993, he and other Logan Heights Gang members were assigned to kill Joaquín Guzmán Loera at the Guadalajara Airport but in the shoot-out that followed, six bystanders were killed, including the Roman Catholic Cardinal Juan Jesus Posadas Ocampo. Mendez was arrested in late June 1993.

Death 
On September 1993, Mendez was killed inside a Mexican prison by other inmates while awaiting trial for murder.

References

American people of Mexican descent
People from San Diego
1993 deaths
Tijuana Cartel traffickers
1969 births
Mexican people who died in prison custody
Hispanic and Latino American gangsters